Neotrombicula autumnalis, known as the harvest mite or autumn chigger, is a species of mite of the family Trombiculidae. Their larvae live parasitically; they infect all domestic mammals, humans, and some ground-nesting birds.

Description

The larvae are normally orange or red with six legs, but develop eight legs by nymph stage.

Lifecycle
 
The eggs are laid in damp soil. After hatching, the larvae climb blades of grass and wait for a potential host. With their "blade-like chelicerae", they attach themselves to the hosts and feed on their tissues. After sucking, which lasts several days, they fall off and develop over three stages of nymph to adult mites.

References

Trombiculidae
Animals described in 1790
Parasitic arthropods of humans
3. Gilbert White The Natural History and of Selbourne (JM Dent & Sons Ltd, 1906) described in letter dated 30 March 1771